ESDF may refer to:

 Ronneby Airport (ICAO code)
 Arrow keys#ESDF keys (Arrow keys)